Zhang Mingliang is a Chinese wheelchair curler,  and .

Teams

References

External links

Living people
Chinese male curlers
Chinese wheelchair curlers
World wheelchair curling champions
Year of birth missing (living people)
Place of birth missing (living people)
Wheelchair curlers at the 2022 Winter Paralympics
Medalists at the 2022 Winter Paralympics
Paralympic medalists in wheelchair curling
Paralympic gold medalists for China
21st-century Chinese people